Mariam Orachelasjvili (1887-1937) was a Soviet-Georgian Politician (Communist).

She served as Minister of Education in 1936–1937.

References

1887 births
1937 deaths
20th-century women politicians from Georgia (country)
20th-century politicians from Georgia (country)
Soviet women in politics
Communists from Georgia (country)
Women government ministers of Georgia (country)